Ryan A. Schau (born December 30, 1975) is a former American football offensive lineman in the National Football League for the Philadelphia Eagles and Houston Texans. He played college football at the University of Illinois.

References

1975 births
Living people
American football offensive linemen
Houston Texans players
Sportspeople from Hammond, Indiana
Philadelphia Eagles players